This is a list of college towns, residential areas (towns, districts, etc.) that are socioeconomically dominated by a college or university, sorted by continent.

Generally, to be classified as a college town, a town should exhibit one or more of the following:

 The town is known for the presence of a college or university.
 The college or university is the largest employer in the town.
 College or university students form a significant proportion of the town's population.

Africa

South Africa 

Alice (University of Fort Hare)
 Bellville (Cape Peninsula University of Technology, University of the Western Cape)
 Bloemfontein (Central University of Technology, University of the Free State)
 Cape Town (University of Cape Town, Cape Peninsula University of Technology)
 Durban (Mangosuthu University of Technology, Durban University of Technology, University of KwaZulu-Natal - Howard College Campus)
 Empangeni (University of Zululand)
 Ga-Rankuwa (Sefako Makgatho Health Sciences University)
 George (Nelson Mandela University)
 Johannesburg (University of Johannesburg, University of the Witwatersrand)
 Kimberley (Sol Plaatje University
 Mahikeng (North-West University)
 Makhanda (Rhodes University)
 Mankweng (University of Limpopo)
 Mbombela (University of Mpumalanga)
 Mthatha (Walter Sisulu University)
Pietermaritzburg (Durban University of Technology, University of KwaZulu-Natal - Pietermaritzburg Campus)
 Pinetown (University of KwaZulu-Natal - Edgewood Campus)
 Port Elizabeth (Nelson Mandela University)
 Potchefstroom (North-West University)
 Pretoria (Tshwane University of Technology Main Campus, University of Pretoria, University of South Africa)
 Stellenbosch (Stellenbosch University)
 Thohoyandou (University of Venda)
Vanderbijlpark (North-West University - Vaal Triangle Campus, Vaal University of Technology)
 Westville (University of KwaZulu-Natal - Westville Campus)

Asia

Bahrain
Busaiteen (Royal College of Surgeons in Ireland - Bahrain)
Isa Town (University of Bahrain - Isa Town, Bahrain Polytechnic)
Manama (University of Bahrain College of Health Sciences, Arabian Gulf University, Ahlia University, Bahrain Institute of Banking and Finance)
Riffa (American University of Bahrain, Royal University for Women)
Sar (British University of Bahrain, University College of Bahrain)
Salmabad (AMA International University)
Sanad (Gulf University, Bahrain)
Sitra (Applied Science University (Bahrain))
Zallaq (University of Bahrain main campus)

China
Songjiang University Town (Shanghai International Studies University, Donghua University, DeTao Master Academy, Shanghai Institute of Visual Art, East China University of Political Science and Law, Shanghai University of International Business and Economics, Shanghai Lixin University of Commerce, and Shanghai University of Engineering Sciences)
Suzhou Dushu Lake Higher Education Town (Features the Renmin University of China, Soochow University, Nanjing University, Xi'an Jiantong-Liverpool University, Skema Business School, Southeast University-Monash University Joint Graduate School, as well as campuses for the National University of Singapore, University of Science and Technology of China, Shandong University, Wuhan University, Sichuan University, North China Electric Power University, and much more).
University Town of Shenzhen (Graduate School at Shenzhen, Tsinghua University, Graduate School at Shenzhen, Peking University, Graduate School at Shenzhen, Harbin Institute of Technology, South University of Science and Technology, Shenzhen University, and more).
Guangzhou Higher Education Mega Center (Sun Yat-sen University, South China University of Technology, South China Normal University, Guangzhou University, Xinghai Conservatory of Music, and Jinan University)
Wudaokou (Tsinghua University, Beijing Language and Culture University, Beihang University, Peking University, and more.)

India
 Aligarh (Aligarh Muslim University)
 North campus ( Delhi University)
 Manipal (Manipal University)
 Kharagpur (IIT Kharagpur)
Lonere (Dr. Babasaheb Ambedkar Technological University)
 Pilani (Birla Institute of Technology and Science)
 Vellore (Vellore Institute of Technology, Christian Medical College)
 Kumarganj (Acharya Narendra Deva University of Agriculture and Technology)
 Saifai (Uttar Pradesh University of Medical Sciences)
Shantiniketan (Visva-Bharati University)

Indonesia
Bandung (Bandung Institute of Technology, Padjadjaran University, Parahyangan Catholic University, Universitas Islam Bandung, Maranatha Christian University, Universitas Pendidikan Indonesia, Universitas Jenderal Achmad Yani, Institut Teknologi Telkom, among many others.)
Jatinangor (Padjadjaran University, Bandung Institute of Technology, IPDN)
Jember (Universitas Jember)
Malang (University of Brawijaya, State University of Malang, Muhammadiyah University of Malang, Islamic University of Malang)
Purwokerto (General Soedirman University, Muhammadiyah University of Purwokerto, Telkom Institute of Technology of Purwokerto, Prof. KH. Saifuddin Zuhri State Islamic University, Wijayakusuma University)

Malaysia
Kota Samarahan, Sarawak (Universiti Malaysia Sarawak, Universiti Teknologi MARA Kota Samarahan Campus (2 campuses), Institute of Teacher Education (Tun Abdul Razak Campus, Kota Samarahan Industrial Training Institute (ILPKS) and AAA Zenith Services (English language service provider).
Kubang Pasu District, Kedah (Universiti Utara Malaysia, Polytechnic of Sultan Abdul Halim Mu'adzam Shah, Industrial Training Institute (ILP), Bandar Darulaman Community College (Kolej Komuniti Bandar Darulaman), Akademi Binaan Malaysia (ABM), Institut Kemahiran Belia Negara (IKBS)).
 Sepanggar, Sabah (The main campus for Universiti Malaysia Sabah (UMS), Universiti Teknologi MARA Sabah, Kota Kinabalu Polytechnic and Kota Kinabalu Industrial Park (KKIP), are situated here.)

Philippines
Baguio (University of the Philippines Baguio, Saint Louis University, University of Baguio, and University of the Cordilleras)
Baybay, Leyte (Visayas State University)
Dumaguete (Silliman University, Negros Oriental State University, Foundation University, and St. Paul University Dumaguete)
Iloilo City (Central Philippine University, University of the Philippines Visayas, and University of San Agustin)
La Trinidad, Benguet (Benguet State University)
Lopez, Quezon (Lopez Campus of the Polytechnic University of the Philippines, South Luzon Campus of the Philippine Normal University, Quezon Campus of the Technological University of the Philippines, Lopez Campus of Laguna State Polytechnic University)
Los Baños, Laguna (University of the Philippines Los Baños)
Marawi (Mindanao State University)
 Mintal, Davao City (University of the Philippines Mindanao)
Muñoz (Central Luzon State University)
Musuan, Maramag, Bukidnon (Central Mindanao University)
Manila (University Belt)
Cebu City (Don Bosco Technical College-Cebu, Inc., University of San Carlos, University of San Jose-Recoletos, University of the Visayas, University of Cebu, University of the Philippines Cebu, Cebu Institute of Technology – University, Southwestern University (Philippines), Cebu Normal University, Cebu Technological University, Cebu Doctors' University Hospital, Velez College, Saint Theresa's College of Cebu, University of Southern Philippines Foundation, Cebu Institute of Medicine, Asian College of Technology, Cebu Eastern College, Salazar Colleges of Science and Institute of Technology, College of Technological Sciences–Cebu)

Taiwan
Hsinchu (National Tsing Hua University, National Yang Ming Chiao Tung University, Chung Hua University, Hsuan Chuang University, Yuanpei University of Medical Technology, and National Hsinchu University of Education)
Huwei Township (National Formosa University)
Puli Township (National Chi Nan University)
Miaoli City (National United University)
Minxiong Township (National Chiayi University, WuFeng University and National Chung Cheng University)
Pingtung City (National Pingtung University)
Shoufeng Township (National Dong Hwa University, Taiwan Hospitality and Tourism University)
Taitung City (National Taitung University, National Taitung Junior College)
Yilan City (National Ilan University)

Europe

Austria
Dornbirn (Vorarlberg University of Applied Sciences)
Eisenstadt (University of Applied Sciences Burgenland)
Feldkirchen in Kärnten (Carinthia University of Applied Sciences)
Graz (University of Graz, Graz University of Technology, Medical University of Graz, University of Music and Performing Arts Graz, FH Joanneum)
 Hagenberg im Mühlkreis (Johannes Kepler University Linz spin-off, as well as a Fachhochschule for various computer-related studies, (polytechnic))
Hall in Tirol (UMIT - Private University for Health Sciences, Medical Informatics and Technology)
Innsbruck (University of Innsbruck, Medical University of Innsbruck, MCI Management Center Innsbruck, FH Gesundheit)
Klagenfurt (University of Klagenfurt, Carinthia University of Applied Sciences) 
Krems an der Donau (University for Continuing Education Krems, Karl Landsteiner University of Health Sciences, IMC University of Applied Sciences Krems)
Kuchl (Salzburg University of Applied Sciences)
Kufstein (University of Applied Sciences)
 Linz (Anton Bruckner Private University, Catholic Private University Linz, Johannes Kepler University Linz, University of Art and Design Linz)
Leoben (University of Leoben)
Pinkafeld (University of Applied Sciences Burgenland)
Puch bei Hallein (Salzburg University of Applied Sciences)
 Salzburg (University of Salzburg, Paracelsus Medical University, Mozarteum University Salzburg, Alma Mater Europaea)
Sankt Pölten (New Design University, St. Pölten University of Applied Sciences)
Seekirchen am Wallersee (Private University Seeburg Castle)
Spittal an der Drau (Carinthia University of Applied Sciences)
Stadtschlaining (European Peace University)
Steyr (University of Applied Sciences Upper Austria)
Villach (Carinthia University of Applied Sciences)
Wels (University of Applied Sciences Upper Austria)
Wiener Neustadt (University of Applied Sciences)

Belgium
Antwerp (Universiteit Antwerpen)
Gembloux (Gembloux Agro-Bio Tech)
Ghent (Ghent University)
Hasselt (Universiteit Hasselt)
Leuven (Katholieke Universiteit Leuven)
Liège (University of Liège)
Louvain-la-Neuve (Université catholique de Louvain)
Mons (Université de Mons, UCLouvain FUCaM Mons)
Namur (Université de Namur, Université catholique de Louvain branch)
Tournai (Université catholique de Louvain branch)

Bulgaria
Blagoevgrad (American University in Bulgaria, South-West University "Neofit Rilski")
Burgas (Burgas Free University)
Gabrovo (Technical University of Gabrovo)
Pernik (European Polytechnical University)
Pleven (Medical University Pleven)
Plovdiv (Agricultural University of Plovdiv, Medical University – Plovdiv, Plovdiv University)
Ruse (Ruse University)
Shumen (University of Shumen "Episkop Konstantin Preslavski")
Stara Zagora (Trakia University - Stara Zagora)
Svishtov (D. A. Tsenov Academy of Economics)
Varna (Medical University of Varna, Technical University of Varna, University of Economics Varna, Varna Free University, Varna University of Management)
Veliko Tarnovo (Veliko Tarnovo University)

Croatia
Dubrovnik (University of Dubrovnik)
Koprivnica (University North)
Opatija (University of Rijeka, Faculty of Tourism and Hospitality Management)
Osijek (Josip Juraj Strossmayer University of Osijek)
Pula (Juraj Dobrila University of Pula
Rijeka (University of Rijeka)
Split (University of Split)
Varaždin (University North)
Vukovar (Polytechnic "Lavoslav Ružička" in Vukovar)
Zadar (University of Zadar)

Czech Republic
 Brno (Brno University of Technology, Masaryk University, Mendel University, Janáček Academy of Music and Performing Arts)
České Budějovice (University of South Bohemia in České Budějovice)
Hradec Králové (University of Hradec Králové
Liberec (Technical University of Liberec)
Mladá Boleslav (Škoda Auto University)
 Olomouc (Palacký University)
Opava (Silesian University (Opava))
 Ostrava (Technical University of Ostrava)
Pardubice (University of Pardubice)
Plzeň (University of West Bohemia)
Ústí nad Labem (Jan Evangelista Purkyně University in Ústí nad Labem)
Zlín (Tomas Bata University in Zlín)

Denmark
Alborg (Aalborg University)
Arhus (Aarhus University)
Esbjerg (University of Southern Denmark, Aalborg University branch campus, Danish National Academy of Music)
Fredericia (Fredericia Maskinmesterskole)
Frederiksberg (Copenhagen Business School, University of Copenhagen branch campus)
Helsingør (University of Copenhagen branch campus)
Herning (Aarhus University branch campus)
Hørsholm (University of Copenhagen branch campus)
Kolding (University of Southern Denmark, Design School Kolding)
Kongens Lyngby (Technical University of Denmark)
Nødebo (University of Copenhagen branch campus)
Odense (University of Southern Denmark main campus, Danish National Academy of Music)
Roskilde (Roskilde University)
Slagelse (University of Southern Denmark)
Sønderborg (University of Southern Denmark, University College South)
Taastrup (University of Copenhagen branch campus)

Estonia
Tartu (University of Tartu, Estonian University of Life Sciences, Tartu Art College)

Finland
Espoo (Aalto University)
Jakobstad (Åbo Akademi)
Joensuu (University of Eastern Finland)
Jyväskylä (University of Jyväskylä)
Kuopio (University of Eastern Finland)
Lappeenranta (Lappeenranta University of Technology)
Oulu (University of Oulu)
Pori (University of Turku and University of Tampere branch campus)
Rovaniemi (University of Lapland)
Savonlinna (University of Eastern Finland)
Seinäjoki (University of Tampere branch campus)
Tampere (University of Tampere)
Turku (Åbo Akademi, University of Turku)
Vaasa (Åbo Akademi, University of Vaasa, Hanken School of Economics)

France
Aix-en-Provence (Aix-Marseille University)
Amiens (University of Picardy Jules Verne)
Angers (University of Angers, Catholic University of the West)
Annecy (University of Savoy)
Arras (Artois University)
Avignon (University of Avignon)
Besançon (University of Franche-Comté)
Bobigny (Paris 13 University)
Bordeaux (University of Bordeaux, Bordeaux Montaigne University, University of Pau and the Adour Region)
Boulogne-sur-Mer (University of the Littoral Opal Coast)
Brest (University of Western Brittany)
Bruz (Catholic University of Rennes)
Caen (University of Caen Normandy)
Calais (University of the Littoral Opal Coast)
Cergy-Pontoise (Cergy-Pontoise University)
Chambéry (University of Savoy)
Champs-sur-Marne (University of Marne-la-Vallée)
Clermont-Ferrand (University of Clermont Auvergne)
Colmar (University of Upper Alsace)
Corte, Haute-Corse (University of Corsica Pasquale Paoli)
Créteil (Paris-Est Créteil University)
Dijon (University of Burgundy)
Dunkerque (University of the Littoral Opal Coast)
Évry, Essonne (University of Évry Val d'Essonne)
Gières (Grenoble Alpes University
Grenoble (Grenoble Alpes University)
La Rochelle (University of La Rochelle)
La Roche-sur-Yon (Catholic University of the Vendée)
Le Havre (University of Le Havre)
Le Mans (Le Mans University)
Lille (University of Lille)
Limoges (University of Limoges
Lorient (University of Southern Brittany)
Lyon (Jean Moulin University Lyon 3, Lumière University Lyon 2)
Mantes-la-Jolie (Versailles Saint-Quentin-en-Yvelines University - IUT of Mantes-en-Yvelines)
Marseille (Aix-Marseille University) 
Montpellier (University of Montpellier)
Mulhouse (University of Upper Alsace)
Nanterre (Paris Nanterre University)
Nantes (University of Nantes)
Nîmes (University of Nîmes)
Orléans (University of Orléans)
Pau, Pyrénées-Atlantiques (University of Pau and the Adour Region
Perpignan (University of Perpignan)
Poitiers (University of Poitiers)
Pontivy (University of Southern Brittany)
Reims (University of Reims Champagne-Ardenne)
Rennes (University of Rennes 1, University of Rennes 2)
Roubaix (University of Lille branch campus)
Rouen (University of Rouen)
Saint-Aubin, Essonne (University of Paris-Saclay)
Saint-Denis, Seine-Saint-Denis (Paris 13 University, Paris 8 University)
Saint-Étienne (Jean Monnet University)
Saint-Martin-d'Hères (Grenoble Alpes University)
Saint-Quentin-en-Yvelines (Versailles Saint-Quentin-en-Yvelines University, University of Paris-Saclay)
Strasbourg (University of Strasbourg)
Tarbes (University of Pau and the Adour Region, Paul Sabatier University branch campus)
Toulon (University of Toulon)
Toulouse (Paul Sabatier University, University of Toulouse-Jean Jaurès, Toulouse 1 University Capitole)
Tours (University of Tours)
Valenciennes (University of Valenciennes and Hainaut-Cambresis)
Vannes (University of Southern Brittany)
Vélizy-Villacoublay (Versailles Saint-Quentin-en-Yvelines University - IUT of Vélizy)
Versailles, Yvelines (Versailles Saint-Quentin-en-Yvelines University, University of Paris-Saclay)
Villeneuve-d'Ascq (University of Lille)
Villetaneuse (Paris 13 University)
Villeurbanne (Claude Bernard University Lyon 1)

Germany
Aachen (RWTH Aachen University)
Bamberg (University of Bamberg)
Bayreuth (University of Bayreuth)
Bielefeld (University of Bielefeld)
Bochum (Ruhr University Bochum)
Bonn (University of Bonn)
Braunschweig (Braunschweig University of Technology, Hochschule für Bildende Künste Braunschweig, Fachhochschule Braunschweig/Wolfenbüttel)
Bremen (University of Bremen, Jacobs University Bremen)
Chemnitz (Chemnitz University of Technology)
Clausthal-Zellerfeld (Clausthal University of Technology)
Cologne (University of Cologne)
Cottbus (Brandenburg University of Technology)
Darmstadt (Darmstadt University of Technology)
Dortmund (Technical University of Dortmund)
Dresden (TU Dresden)
Duisburg (University of Duisburg-Essen)
Düsseldorf (University of Düsseldorf)
Eichstätt (Catholic University of Eichstätt-Ingolstadt)
Erfurt (University of Erfurt)
Erlangen (University of Erlangen-Nuremberg)
Essen (University of Duisburg-Essen)
Flensburg (University of Flensburg)
Frankfurt am Main (Goethe University Frankfurt)
Frankfurt (Oder) (Viadrina European University
Freiberg (Freiberg University of Mining and Technology)
Freiburg im Breisgau (Catholic University of Applied Sciences Freiburg, Hochschule für Musik Freiburg, International University of Cooperative Education, Protestant University for Applied Sciences Freiburg, University of Freiburg)
Friedrichshafen (Zeppelin University 
Giessen (University of Giessen)
Göttingen (University of Göttingen)
Greifswald (University of Greifswald)
Halle (Saale) (Martin Luther University of Halle-Wittenberg)
Hannover (Leibniz University Hannover)
Heidelberg (Hochschule für Jüdische Studien Heidelberg, Pädagogische Hochschule Heidelberg, Schiller International University, University of Applied Sciences in Heidelberg, University of Heidelberg)
Hildesheim (University of Hildesheim)
Ilmenau (Technical University of Ilmenau
Ingolstadt (Catholic University of Eichstätt-Ingolstadt)
Jena (University of Applied Sciences in Jena, University of Jena)
Kaiserslautern (Kaiserslautern University of Technology)
Karlsruhe (Karlsruhe Institute of Technology)
Kassel (University of Kassel, Summer University, International Winter University (IWU) Kassel)
Kiel (University of Kiel)
Koblenz (University of Koblenz-Landau)
Konstanz (University of Applied Sciences in Konstanz, University of Konstanz)
Landau (University of Koblenz-Landau)
Lübeck (University of Lübeck, Lübeck University of Applied Sciences)
Leipzig (Leipzig University)
Lüneburg (Leuphana University of Lüneburg)
Magdeburg (Otto von Guericke University Magdeburg)
Mainz (Johannes Gutenberg University of Mainz)
Mannheim (University of Mannheim, Mannheim University of Applied Sciences)
Marburg (University of Marburg)
Munich (Ludwig Maximilian University of Munich, Technical University of Munich, Bundeswehr University Munich)
Münster (University of Münster)
Nuremberg (University of Erlangen-Nuremberg)
Oldenburg (University of Oldenburg)
Osnabrück (Osnabrück University)
Paderborn (University of Paderborn)
Passau (University of Passau)
Potsdam (University of Potsdam)
Regensburg (University of Regensburg)
Rostock (University of Rostock)
Saarbrücken (University of Saarland)
Senftenberg (Brandenburg University of Technology)
Siegen (University of Siegen)
Speyer (German University of Administrative Sciences Speyer)
Stuttgart (University of Stuttgart, University of Hohenheim)
Trier (University of Trier)
Tübingen (University of Tübingen)
Ulm (University of Ulm)
Vechta (University of Vechta)
Weimar (University of Vechta)
Witten (Witten/Herdecke University)
Wittenberg (University of Halle-Wittenberg
Wuppertal (University of Wuppertal)
Würzburg (University of Würzburg)

Hungary
 Debrecen
 Szeged (University of Szeged)

Iceland
 Akureyri (University of Akureyri)
 Hólar (Hólar University College)

Ireland

Castletroy (University of Limerick)
Cork (University College Cork)
Galway (National University of Ireland, Galway)
Limerick (University of Limerick)
Maynooth (Maynooth University, St Patrick's College, Maynooth)

Italy

Abruzzo

 Chieti
 L'Aquila
 Pescara
 Teramo

Basilicata

 Matera
 Potenza

Campania

Aversa (Università degli Studi della Campania Luigi Vanvitelli 
Baronissi (University of Salerno Faculty of Health Sciences)
Benevento (University of Sannio)
Capua (Università degli Studi della Campania Luigi Vanvitelli)
Caserta (Università degli Studi della Campania Luigi Vanvitelli Faculty of Health Sciences)
Fisciano (University of Salerno main campus)
Portici (University of Naples Federico II, Faculty of Agriculture and Forestry)
Santa Maria Capua Vetere (Università degli Studi della Campania Luigi Vanvitelli)

Emilia-Romagna 
 Bologna (University of Bologna)
Cesena (University of Bologna Faculty of Psychology)
 Ferrara (University of Ferrara)
Forlì (University of Bologna branch campus)
 Modena (University of Modena and Reggio Emilia)
Ozzano dell'Emilia (University of Bologna Faculty of Veterinary Medicine)
 Parma (University of Parma)
Ravenna (University of Bologna branch campus)
Reggio Emilia (University of Modena and Reggio Emilia)
Rimini (University of Bologna branch campus)

Lazio 
Viterbo (Tuscia University)
Cassino (University of Cassino)

Liguria 
 Genoa (University of Genoa)
La Spezia
Savona

Lombardy 
Bergamo (University of Bergamo)
Brescia (University of Brescia)
Como (University of Insubria)
Monza (University of Milano-Bicocca Faculty of Health Sciences)
Pavia (University of Pavia)
Varese (University of Insubria)

Marche 
 Camerino (University of Camerino)
 Macerata (University of Macerata)
 Urbino (University of Urbino)

Piedmont 
Alessandria (University of Eastern Piedmont)
Biella (University of Turin branch campus)
Novara (University of Eastern Piedmont Faculty of Health Sciences)
Turin (University of Turin)
Vercelli (University of Eastern Piedmont)

Puglia

 Bari
 Foggia
 Lecce

Sardinia

 Cagliari (University of Cagliari)
 Sassari (University of Sassari)

Sicily 
 Catania (University of Catania)
Enna 
 Messina (University of Messina)
Palermo (University of Palermo)

Trentino-Alto Adige/Südtirol  

 Bolzano
 Brixen
 Bruneck
 Trento

Tuscany

Pisa (University of Pisa)
Prato (University of Florence branch campus)
Siena (University of Siena)

Umbria 
 Perugia (University of Perugia)
Terni (University of Perugia)

Valle d'Aosta

 Aosta

Veneto

Padova (University of Padua)
Rovigo (University of Ferrara Faculty of Law)
Treviso (University of Padua branch campus)
Venice (Ca' Foscari University of Venice, Università Iuav di Venezia)
Verona (University of Verona)

Latvia
Daugavpils (University of Daugavpils)
Jelgava (Latvia University of Life Sciences and Technologies)
Liepāja (University of Liepāja)

Liechtenstein 

 Bendern (Liechtenstein Institute)
 Gamprin (Liechtenstein Institute)
 Triesen (Private University in the Principality of Liechtenstein)
 Vaduz (University of Liechtenstein)

Lithuania 

Vilnius (Vilnius University)
Kaunas (Kaunas University of Technology)
Klaipėda (Klaipėda University)
Šiauliai (Šiauliai University

Malta
 Msida (University of Malta)
 Valletta

Netherlands

Delft
Eindhoven
Enschede (University of Twente)
Groningen
Leiden
Maastricht
Nijmegen
Rotterdam
Tilburg
Utrecht
Wageningen

Norway
Bergen
Bø, Telemark
Kristiansand (University of Agder)
Tromsø
Trondheim

Poland
 Kraków
 Jagiellonian University
 Cracow University of Technology
 Cracow University of Economics
 Pedagogical University of Cracow
 AGH University of Science and Technology
 Agricultural University of Kraków
 University School of Physical Education in Kraków
 Academy of Fine Arts in Kraków
 Academy of Music in Kraków
 Ludwik Solski Academy for the Dramatic Arts
 
 Pontifical University of John Paul II
 Jesuit University of Philosophy and Education Ignatianum
 
 Łódź
 Wrocław

Portugal
 Coimbra (Universidade de Coimbra)
 Évora (Universidade de Évora)
 Porto
 Braga (Universidade do Minho)
Aveiro (Universidade de Aveiro) 
Covilhã (Universidade da Beira Interior)

Romania
 Cluj-Napoca
 Iași

Russia
 Akademgorodok
 Dubna 
 Skolkovo Innovation Center
 Titanium Valley
 Zelenograd
 Chernogolovka

Serbia
Novi Sad (University of Novi Sad)

Slovakia
 Trnava

Spain
Alcalá de Henares (University of Alcalá)
Bilbao (University of Deusto)
Girona (University of Girona)
Oviedo (University of Oviedo)
Salamanca (University of Salamanca)
Santiago de Compostela (University of Santiago de Compostela)
Seville (University of Seville)
Granada (University of Granada)
Valencia (University of Valencia)
Valladolid (University of Valladolid)
Zaragoza (University of Zaragoza)

Sweden
Alnarp (Alnarp campus of the Swedish University of Agricultural Sciences)
Gävle (University College of Gävle)
Gothenburg (University of Gothenburg, Chalmers University of Technology)
Halmstad (Halmstad University)
Karlstad (Karlstad University)
Kiruna (Department of Space Science belonging to Luleå University of Technology)
Linköping (Linköping University)
Luleå (Luleå University of Technology)
Lund (Lund University)
Malmö (Malmö University, Lund University, United Nations World Maritime University)
Örebro (Örebro University)
Östersund (Mid Sweden University)
Skövde (University of Skövde)
Solna (Karolinska Institute)
Umeå (Umeå University)
Uppsala (Uppsala University)
Visby (Uppsala University)
Växjö (Linnaeus University)

Switzerland
Basel (University of Basel)
Bern (University of Bern)
Fribourg (University of Fribourg, University of Applied Sciences of Western Switzerland, Conservatoire of Fribourg)
Geneva (University of Geneva)
Lausanne (University of Lausanne, École Polytechnique Fédérale de Lausanne)
Lugano (University of Italian Switzerland, University of Applied Sciences and Arts of Southern Switzerland, Franklin University Switzerland)
Neuchâtel (University of Neuchâtel)
St. Gallen (University of St. Gallen)

Turkey
Eskişehir (Anadolu University, Eskişehir Osmangazi University)

Ukraine
Ostroh (National University Ostroh Academy)

United Kingdom

England
Bath (University of Bath, Bath Spa University)
Bedford (University of Bedfordshire)
Birmingham (Aston University, University of Birmingham, Birmingham City University, University College Birmingham, Newman University)
Bradford (University of Bradford)
Brighton (University of Brighton, Brighton and Sussex Medical School, University of Sussex)
Bristol (University of Bristol, University of the West of England, The University of Law, Trinity College, Bristol)
Buckingham (University of Buckingham)
Bury St Edmunds (University of Suffolk)
Cambridge (Anglia Ruskin University, University of Cambridge)
Canterbury (University of Kent, Canterbury Christ Church University, University for the Creative Arts)
Carlisle (University of Cumbria)
Chatham (University of Kent)
Chelmsford (Anglia Ruskin University, Writtle University College)
Cheltenham (Gloucestershire University)
Chester (University of Chester)
Cirencester (Royal Agricultural University)
Colchester (University of Essex, Colchester Institute)
Coventry (Coventry University, University of Warwick)
Derby (University of Derby)
Durham (Durham University)
Epsom (University for the Creative Arts)
Exeter (University of Exeter, University of Plymouth, Peninsula College of Medicine and Dentistry)
Falmouth (Falmouth University)
Farnham (University for the Creative Arts)
Gloucester (University of Gloucestershire)
Great Yarmouth (University of Suffolk)
Guildford (University of Surrey)
Hatfield, Hertfordshire (University of Hertfordshire)
High Wycombe (Buckinghamshire New University)
Huddersfield (University of Huddersfield)
Ipswich (University of Suffolk) 
Keele (Keele University)
Kingston upon Hull (Hull School of Art, Hull York Medical School, University of Hull, University of Lincoln)
Lancaster (Lancaster University, University of Cumbria)
Leicester (De Montfort University, University of Leicester)
Lichfield (Staffordshire University)
Lincoln (University of Lincoln, Bishop Grosseteste University)
Loughborough (Loughborough University)
Lowestoft (University of Suffolk)
Luton (University of Bedfordshire)
Maidenhead (Berkshire College of Agriculture)
Manchester (University of Manchester, Manchester Metropolitan University, Royal Northern College of Music)
Middlesbrough (Teesside University)
Milton Keynes (Open University, University of Bedfordshire)
Newcastle upon Tyne (Newcastle University, Northumbria University)
Newport, Shropshire (Harper Adams University)
Northampton (University of Northampton)
Norwich (University of East Anglia, Norwich University of the Arts)
Nottingham (Nottingham Trent University, University of Nottingham)
Ormskirk (Edge Hill University)
Oxford (Oxford Brookes University, University of Oxford)
Penryn (Falmouth University)
Peterborough (Anglia Ruskin University)
Plymouth (University of Plymouth, Peninsula College of Medicine and Dentistry, University of St Mark & St John, City College Plymouth, Plymouth College of Art)
Portsmouth (University of Portsmouth)
Preston (University of Central Lancashire)
Reading (University of Reading, University of West London, University College of Estate Management)
Rochester, Kent (University for the Creative Arts)
Salford (University of Salford)
Sheffield (University of Sheffield, Sheffield Hallam University)
Shrewsbury (Staffordshire University)
Southampton (University of Southampton, Southampton Solent University)
Stafford (Staffordshire University)
Stoke on Trent (Staffordshire University)
Sunderland (University of Sunderland)
Winchester (University of Winchester)
Wolverhampton (University of Wolverhampton)
Worcester (University of Worcester)
York (University of York, York St John University, Hull York Medical School)

Northern Ireland
Coleraine (University of Ulster)
Derry (University of Ulster)
Jordanstown (University of Ulster)

Scotland
Aberdeen (University of Aberdeen, Robert Gordon University)
Ayr (University of the West of Scotland)
Dumfries (University of the West of Scotland)
Dundee (University of Dundee, Abertay University)
Edinburgh (University of Edinburgh, Heriot-Watt University, Edinburgh Napier University, Scotland's Rural College University, Queen Margaret University)
Glasgow (University of Glasgow, University of Strathclyde, Glasgow Caledonian University, Glasgow School of Art)
Hamilton, South Lanarkshire (University of the West of Scotland)
Inverness (University of the Highlands and Islands)
Musselburgh (Queen Margaret University)
Paisley (University of the West of Scotland)
St Andrews (University of St Andrews)
Stirling (University of Stirling)

Wales
Aberystwyth (Aberystwyth University)
Bangor (Bangor University)
Cardiff (Cardiff University, Cardiff Metropolitan University, University of South Wales)
Carmarthen (University of Wales, Trinity Saint David)
Lampeter (University of Wales, Trinity Saint David)
Newport (University of South Wales)
Northop (Wrexham Glyndŵr University)
Pontypridd (University of South Wales)
St Asaph (Wrexham Glyndŵr University)
Trefforest (University of South Wales)
Wrexham (Wrexham Glyndŵr University, Coleg Cambria)

South America

Argentina 
Chamical (Federal University of La Rioja, Chamical)
La Plata (National University of La Plata)

Brazil  
Juiz de Fora, Minas Gerais (Federal University of Juiz de Fora)
Niterói, Rio de Janeiro (Fluminense Federal University)
Pelotas, Rio Grande do Sul (Federal University of Pelotas)
Santa Maria, Rio Grande do Sul (Federal University of Santa Maria, Fransciscan University Center, Lutheran University of Brazil)
São Carlos, São Paulo (Federal University of São Carlos)
São João del-Rei, Minas Gerais (Federal University of São João del-Rei)
Viçosa, Minas Gerais (Federal University of Viçosa)

Colombia  
University City of Bogotá (National University of Colombia)
Las Aguas Universidades (The Andes University, Universidad del Rosario, Universidad Externado de Colombia)
Marly, Bogotá (Pontifical Xavierian University)
El Poblado, Medellín (EAFIT University)
Pamplona (Universidad de Pamplona)

Venezuela  
Mérida (University of the Andes, Mérida)

United States

Alabama
Auburn (Auburn University, Edward Via College of Osteopathic Medicine)
Fairfield (Miles College)
Florence (Heritage Christian University, University of North Alabama)
Homewood (Samford University)
Huntsville (University of Alabama Huntsville, Alabama A&M University)
Jacksonville (Jacksonville State University)
Livingston (University of West Alabama)
Mobile (Spring Hill College, University of South Alabama)
Montevallo (University of Montevallo)
Montgomery (Alabama State University, Huntingdon College, Auburn University at Montgomery, H. Councill Trenholm State Community College, Faulkner University)
Troy (Troy University)
Tuscaloosa (University of Alabama, Stillman College, Shelton State)
Tuskegee (Tuskegee University)

Alaska
Anchorage (University of Alaska Anchorage)
Fairbanks (University of Alaska Fairbanks)
Juneau (University of Alaska Southeast)
Ketchikan (University of Alaska Southeast-extended campus)
Sitka (University of Alaska Southeast-extended campus)

Arizona
Chandler (Western International University, University of Phoenix, International Baptist College, Ottawa University (adult education programs), Chandler University)
Flagstaff (Northern Arizona University)
Gilbert
Glendale (Arizona Christian University, Midwestern University Glendale campus, formerly Thunderbird School of Global Management)
Lake Havasu City (ASU Colleges at Lake Havasu City, Northern Arizona University extended campus)
Mesa (Arizona State University Polytechnic campus, Benedictine University branch campus, Upper Iowa University branch campus, A.T. Still University School of Osteopathic Medicine in Arizona)
Peoria (Trine University branch campus)
Prescott (Embry–Riddle Aeronautical University, Yavapai College, Prescott College, Northern Arizona University, Old Dominion University)
Scottsdale (University of Phoenix)
Tempe (Arizona State University, University of Phoenix, Brookline College, Bryan University)
Tucson (University of Arizona, Tucson College, Brown Mackie College, Brookline College, University of Phoenix, The Art Institute of Tucson, Prescott College branch campus, Northern Arizona University branch campus, The Art Center Design College, Wayland Baptist University)

Arkansas
Arkadelphia (Henderson State University, Ouachita Baptist University)
Conway (Central Baptist College, Hendrix College, University of Central Arkansas)
Fayetteville (University of Arkansas)
Fort Smith (University of Arkansas at Fort Smith, Webster University satellite campus, John Brown University satellite campus, Arkansas College of Osteopathic Medicine)
Jonesboro (Arkansas State University)
Little Rock (University of Arkansas at Little Rock, University of Arkansas for Medical Sciences, Philander Smith College, Arkansas Baptist College)
Magnolia (Southern Arkansas University)
Monticello (University of Arkansas at Monticello)
Russellville (Arkansas Tech University)
Searcy (Harding University)

California
Angwin (Pacific Union College)
Arcata (Humboldt State University)
Azusa (Azusa Pacific University)
Berkeley (University of California, Berkeley)
Chico (California State University, Chico, Cal Northern School of Law)
Claremont (Claremont McKenna College, Pomona College, Harvey Mudd College, Scripps College, Pitzer College, Keck Graduate Institute, Claremont Graduate University)
Cotati (California State University, Sonoma)
Davis (University of California, Davis)
Irvine (University of California, Irvine, Western State College of Law at Argosy University)
Isla Vista (University of California, Santa Barbara)
La Verne (University of La Verne)
Loma Linda (Loma Linda University)
Merced (University of California, Merced, Merced College)
Orange (Chapman University)
Palo Alto (Stanford University)
Pasadena (California Institute of Technology, Pasadena City College, Pacific Oaks College)
Pomona (Cal Poly Pomona, Western University of Health Sciences) and formerly Pomona College
Redlands (University of Redlands)
Riverside (University of California, Riverside, California Baptist University, La Sierra University, California Southern Law School)
Rocklin (Sierra College, William Jessup University)
San Luis Obispo (California Polytechnic State University, University of San Luis Obispo School of Law)
San Marcos (California State University San Marcos, University of St. Augustine for Health Sciences)
Santa Barbara (Fielding Graduate University, Santa Barbara City College, University of California, Santa Barbara, Westmont College, Santa Barbara College of Law, Southern California Institute of Law)
Santa Cruz (University of California, Santa Cruz)
Seaside (Monterey College of Law, California State University, Monterey Bay)
Stanford (Stanford University)
Turlock (California State University, Stanislaus)
University District (California State University, San Bernardino)
Whittier (Whittier College, Rio Hondo College)

Colorado
Alamosa (Adams State College)
Aurora (Columbia College–Aurora, Ecotech Institute, University of Colorado Denver at the Anschutz Medical Campus, Colorado Community College System)
Boulder (University of Colorado at Boulder, Naropa University)
Colorado Springs (United States Air Force Academy, University of Colorado Colorado Springs, Colorado College, Colorado Technical University)
Durango (Fort Lewis College)
Fort Collins (Colorado State University)
Golden (Colorado School of Mines)
Grand Junction (Colorado Mesa University)
Greeley (University of Northern Colorado)
Gunnison (Western State College)
Lakewood (Colorado Christian University)
Pueblo (Colorado State University–Pueblo)

Connecticut
Bridgeport (University of Bridgeport)
Danbury (Western Connecticut State University)
East Hartford (Goodwin College)
Fairfield (Fairfield University, Sacred Heart University)
Farmington (UConn Health)
Hamden (Quinnipiac University)
Hartford (Rensselaer at Hartford, Trinity College, University of Connecticut School of Law)
Middletown (Wesleyan University)
New Britain (Central Connecticut State University)
New Haven (Southern Connecticut State University, Albertus Magnus College)
Downtown New Haven (Yale University)
New London (Connecticut College, US Coast Guard Academy, Mitchell College)
North Haven (Quinnipiac University graduate campus)
Southington (New England Baptist College)
Stamford (University of Connecticut, University of Bridgeport and Sacred Heart University branch campuses)
Storrs (University of Connecticut)
Waterbury (Post University, University of Bridgeport (Regional Campus), University of Connecticut (Regional Campus / Downtown Waterbury), Western Connecticut State University (Regional Campus))
Willimantic (Eastern Connecticut State University)
West Hartford (University of Hartford, University of Saint Joseph, University of Connecticut Greater Hartford campus)
West Haven (University of New Haven)

Delaware
Dover (Delaware State University, Wesley College)
Newark (University of Delaware)
New Castle (Wilmington University)
Wilmington (Delaware College of Art & Design, Drexel University – Wilmington Campus, Springfield College – Wilmington Campus, Widener University–Delaware Campus)

Florida
Ave Maria (Ave Maria University)
Boca Raton (Florida Atlantic University)
Bradenton (Lake Erie College of Osteopathic Medicine branch campus)
Brandon
Cape Coral (Florida Gulf Coast University satellite facility)
Coral Gables (University of Miami)
Coral Springs (Barry University, Nova Southeastern University and Broward College)
Davie (Nova Southeastern University)
Daytona Beach (Embry–Riddle Aeronautical University, Bethune-Cookman University, Daytona State College)
DeLand (Stetson University)
Estero (Florida Gulf Coast University)
Fort Lauderdale (Broward College BC (Willis Holcombe Downtown Center), City College, Florida Atlantic University FAU (satellite campus), Florida International University FIU (satellite campus), Keiser University, Nova Southeastern University NSU (satellite campus), The Art Institute of Fort Lauderdale, University of Phoenix (Cypress Creek Learning Center), Jersey College)
Fort Myers (Florida Gulf Coast University)
Gainesville (University of Florida, Santa Fe College)
Gulfport (Stetson University College of Law, St. Petersburg College, University of South Florida branch campus)
Hialeah (College of Business and Technology, Florida National University)
Hollywood
Kendall (Keiser College, Miami-Dade College (Kendall Campus), Nova Southeastern University (Miami Student Educational Center), College of Business and Technology (Kendall Campus))
Lakeland (Southeastern University)
Miami Gardens (St. Thomas University, Florida Memorial University, CBT College)
Miami Shores (Barry University)
Miramar (Broward College (Miramar Town Center), Broward College (Miramar West Center), Florida International University (FIU) (Miramar West Center), Nova Southeastern University (Miramar Campus))
North Miami (Florida International University Biscayne Bay Campus)
Panama City (Gulf Coast State College)
Pembroke Pines (The Broward-Pines Center regional campus of Barry University, The Broward-Pines Center regional campus of Broward College, The Broward-Pines Center regional campus of Florida International University, The South regional campus of Broward College, Keiser University Pembroke Pines Campus)
Pensacola (University of West Florida, Pensacola Christian College)
Port St. Lucie (Indian River State College, Barry University, and Keiser University)
Sarasota (New College of Florida, Ringling College of Art and Design, State College of Florida, Manatee-Sarasota, University of South Florida Sarasota-Manatee)
St. Augustine (Flagler College)
St. Leo (St. Leo University)
St. Petersburg (University of South Florida St. Petersburg, Eckerd College, St. Petersburg College)
Sunrise
Tallahassee (Florida State University, Florida A&M University)
West Palm Beach (Palm Beach Atlantic University, Keiser University)

Georgia
Albany (Albany State University)
Athens (University of Georgia, Athens Technical College)
Augusta (Augusta Technical College, Augusta University, Paine College, East Georgia State College)
Blue Ridge (University of North Georgia)
Brunswick (College of Coastal Georgia)
Carrollton (University of West Georgia)
Columbus (Columbus State University, Columbus Technical College)
Dahlonega (University of North Georgia)
Demorest (Piedmont University)
Fort Valley (Fort Valley State University)
Glennville (Southeastern Technical College)
Kennesaw (Kennesaw State University)
Lawrenceville (Georgia Gwinnett College, Gwinnett Technical College)
Madison (Georgia Military College Madison Campus)
Macon (Mercer University, Middle Georgia State University, Wesleyan College, Central Georgia Technical College, Fort Valley State University - satellite campus, Georgia College & State University - satellite campus)
Milledgeville (Georgia College & State University, Georgia Military College)
Mount Vernon (Brewton-Parker College)
Oxford (Oxford College)
Rome (Berry College, Shorter University)
Savannah (Armstrong Atlantic State University, Savannah State University, Savannah College of Art and Design, Savannah Law School)
Statesboro (Georgia Southern University, East Georgia State College)
Swainsboro (East Georgia State College, Southeastern Technical College)
Valdosta (Valdosta State University)
Vidalia (Southeastern Technical College)
Waleska (Reinhardt College)
Watkinsville (University of North Georgia)
Young Harris (Young Harris College)

Hawaii
Laie (Brigham Young University-Hawai'i)

Idaho
Boise (Boise State University, University of Idaho - satellite campus, Idaho State University - satellite campus, Idaho college of osteopathic medicineConcordia University School of Law)
Caldwell (College of Idaho)
Lewiston (Lewis-Clark State College)
Moscow (University of Idaho)
Nampa (Northwest Nazarene University)
Pocatello (Idaho State University)
Rexburg (BYU-Idaho)

Illinois
Aurora (Aurora University)
Bloomington (Illinois Wesleyan University)
Bourbonnais (Olivet Nazarene University)
Carbondale (Southern Illinois University Carbondale)
Champaign–Urbana (University of Illinois)
Charleston (Eastern Illinois University)
Deerfield (Trinity International University)
DeKalb (Northern Illinois University)
Downers Grove (Midwestern University)
East Peoria (Illinois Central College)
Edwardsville (Southern Illinois University Edwardsville)
Elgin (Judson University)
Elmhurst (Elmhurst University)
Evanston (Northwestern University)
Joliet (University of St. Francis)
Lebanon (McKendree University)
Macomb (Western Illinois University)
Naperville (North Central College, Northern Illinois University satellite campus, DePaul University satellite campus, College of DuPage Naperville Regional Center, Governors State University satellite campus, Northwestern College Naperville campus, University of Illinois Urbana-Champaign Business & Industry Services campus)
Normal (Illinois State University)
Peoria (Bradley University)
River Forest (Dominican University, Concordia University)
Rock Island (Augustana College)
Rockford (Rockford University)
Springfield (University of Illinois Springfield, Southern Illinois University School of Medicine)
University Park (Governors State University)

Indiana
Angola (Trine University)
Bloomington (Indiana University Bloomington)
Greencastle (DePauw University)
Hanover (Hanover College)
Marion (Indiana Wesleyan University)
Muncie (Ball State University)
Oakland City (Oakland City University)
South Bend (University of Notre Dame, Saint Mary's College, Holy Cross College, and Indiana University South Bend) 
Terre Haute (Indiana State University, Rose-Hulman Institute of Technology)
Upland (Taylor University)
West Lafayette (Purdue University)

Iowa
Ames (Iowa State University)
Bettendorf (Upper Iowa University – satellite campus)
Cedar Falls (University of Northern Iowa) 
Cedar Rapids (Coe College)
Davenport (Saint Ambrose University, Hamilton Technical College)
Decorah (Luther College)
Des Moines (Drake University, Grand View University, Mercy College of Health Sciences, University of Iowa two satellite facilities, AIB College of Business, Des Moines University)
Fayette (Upper Iowa University)
Grinnell (Grinnell College)
Indianola (Simpson College)
Iowa City (University of Iowa)
Lamoni (Graceland University)
Mount Vernon (Cornell College)
Orange City (Northwestern College)
Oskaloosa (William Penn University)
Sioux Center (Dordt College)
Storm Lake (Buena Vista University)
Waverly (Wartburg College)

Kansas
Baldwin City (Baker University)
Emporia (Emporia State University)
Hays (Fort Hays State University)
Lawrence (University of Kansas, Haskell Indian Nations University)
Manhattan (Kansas State University, Manhattan Christian College)
Pittsburg (Pittsburg State University)
Topeka (Washburn University, Friends University, Washburn Institute of Technology (Formerly Kaw Area Technical School), Baker University School of Nursing)
Wichita (Wichita State University (WSU), Friends University - main campus, Newman University, University of Kansas School of Medicine - Wichita campus)

Kentucky
Barbourville (Union College)
Berea (Berea College)
Bowling Green (Western Kentucky University)
Campbellsville (Campbellsville University)
Columbia (Lindsey Wilson College)
Crestview Hills (Thomas More University)
Danville (Centre College, Bluegrass Community and Technical College, Eastern Kentucky University, Midway University, American National University)
Frankfort (Kentucky State University)
Georgetown (Georgetown College)
Grayson (Kentucky Christian University)
Highland Heights (Northern Kentucky University)
Lexington (University of Kentucky, Transylvania University)
Louisville (University of Louisville, Bellarmine University, Simmons College of Kentucky, Spalding University, Sullivan University)
Midway (Midway University)
Morehead (Morehead State University)
Murray (Murray State University)
Owensboro (Brescia University, Kentucky Wesleyan College, Western Kentucky University-Owensboro)
Pikeville (University of Pikeville)
Richmond (Eastern Kentucky University)
Williamsburg (University of the Cumberlands)
Wilmore (Asbury University, Asbury Theological Seminary)

Louisiana
Baton Rouge (Louisiana State University, Southern University and A&M College, Southern University Law Center)
Grambling (Grambling State University)
Hammond (Southeastern Louisiana University)
Lafayette (University of Louisiana at Lafayette)
Monroe (University of Louisiana at Monroe)
Natchitoches (Northwestern State University)
Ruston (Louisiana Tech University)
Thibodaux (Nicholls State University)

Maine
Augusta (University of Maine at Augusta)
Bangor (University of Maine)
Bar Harbor (College of the Atlantic)
Biddeford (University of New England)
Brunswick (Bowdoin College)
Farmington (University of Maine at Farmington)
Fort Kent (University of Maine at Fort Kent)
Gorham (University of Southern Maine)
Lewiston (Bates College)
Machias (University of Maine at Machias)
Orono (University of Maine)
Portland (Maine College of Art, University of Maine School of Law, University of New England (formerly Westbrook College), University of Southern Maine)
Presque Isle (University of Maine at Presque Isle)
Waterville (Thomas College, Colby College)

Maryland
Annapolis (United States Naval Academy, St. John's College)
Chestertown (Washington College)
College Park (University of Maryland, College Park)
Cumberland (Allegany College of Maryland)
Emmitsburg (Mount St. Mary's University)
Frostburg (Frostburg State University)
Germantown (Montgomery College branch campus)
Princess Anne (University of Maryland Eastern Shore)
Salisbury (Salisbury University)
Silver Spring (Montgomery College Takoma Park/Silver Spring campus, Howard University School of Continuing Education)
Takoma Park (Washington Adventist University, Montgomery College (Takoma Park/Silver Spring Campus))
Towson (Towson University, Goucher College)
Westminster (McDaniel College)

Massachusetts
Bridgewater (Bridgewater State College)
Cambridge (Harvard University, Massachusetts Institute of Technology, Lesley University, Cambridge College, Longy School of Music)
 Chestnut Hill (parts) and Boston’s Cleveland Circle neighborhood (Boston College)
 The Colleges of Worcester Consortium:
Dudley (Nichols College)
North Grafton (Cummings School of Veterinary Medicine at Tufts University)
Paxton (Anna Maria College)
Worcester (Assumption, Becker, Clark University, Holy Cross, Mass. College of Pharmacy & Health Sciences, Quinsigamond Community College, UMass Medical School, Worcester State University, Worcester Polytechnic Institute)
 Dartmouth (University of Massachusetts Dartmouth)
 The Fenway area of Boston (Boston University, Emmanuel College, Simmons College, Massachusetts College of Art)
Fitchburg (Fitchburg State College)
 The Five College Region of Western Massachusetts
Amherst (Amherst College, Hampshire College, University of Massachusetts Amherst)
Northampton (Smith College)
South Hadley (Mount Holyoke College)
Lowell (University of Massachusetts Lowell)
Medford (Tufts University)
North Adams (Massachusetts College of Liberal Arts)
North Andover (Merrimack College)
Somerville’s Davis Square neighborhood (Tufts University)
Springfield (Springfield College, Western New England University
Waltham (Bentley University, Brandeis University)
Wellesley (Wellesley College)
Westfield (Westfield State University)
Williamstown (Williams College)

Michigan
Adrian (Adrian College, Siena Heights University)
Albion (Albion College)
Allendale (Grand Valley State University)
Alma (Alma College)
Ann Arbor (Concordia University, University of Michigan)
Berrien Springs (Andrews University)
Big Rapids (Ferris State University)
Dearborn (University of Michigan–Dearborn, Henry Ford College, Concordia University Dearborn Center, Central Michigan University)
East Lansing (Michigan State University)
Flint (Kettering University, University of Michigan-Flint)
Genoa Township (Cleary University main campus)
Hillsdale (Hillsdale College)
 Holland (Hope College)
Houghton (Michigan Technological University)
Kalamazoo (Western Michigan University, Kalamazoo College)
Lansing (Western Michigan University Cooley Law School)
Marquette (Northern Michigan University)
Midland (Northwood University)
Mount Pleasant (Central Michigan University)
Olivet (Olivet College)
Saginaw (Saginaw Valley State University)
Sault Ste. Marie (Lake Superior State University)
Spring Arbor (Spring Arbor University)
Ypsilanti (Eastern Michigan University)
Warren (Davenport University satellite campus, Warren Center for Central Michigan University, Wayne State University's Advanced Technology Education Center)

Minnesota
Bemidji (Bemidji State University)
Crookston (University of Minnesota Crookston)
Duluth (University of Minnesota Duluth, Lake Superior College, The College of St. Scholastica, University of Wisconsin–Superior, Duluth Business University)
Faribault (South Central College)
Mankato (Minnesota State University, Mankato)
Marshall (Southwest Minnesota State University)
Moorhead (Minnesota State University, Moorhead, Concordia College)
Morris (University of Minnesota Morris)
Northfield (Carleton College, St. Olaf College)
North Mankato (South Central College)
Pine City (Pine Technical and Community College)
Rochester (Mayo Clinic Alix School of Medicine)
St. Cloud (St. Cloud State University, The College of St. Scholastica)
St. Joseph (College of Saint Benedict)
Saint Paul (Saint Catherine University, Concordia University, Hamline University, Macalester College, University of St. Thomas, Metropolitan State University, Saint Paul College, Mitchell Hamline School of Law)
St. Peter (Gustavus Adolphus College)
Winona (Winona State University, St. Mary's University of Minnesota)

Mississippi
Blue Mountain (Blue Mountain College)
Clinton (Mississippi College)
Columbus (Mississippi University for Women)
Hattiesburg (University of Southern Mississippi)
Holly Springs (Rust College)
Itta Bena (Mississippi Valley State University)
Jackson (Jackson State University, Millsaps College, Belhaven University, Mississippi College School of Law)
Laurel (Southeastern Baptist College)
Oxford (University of Mississippi)
Southaven (University of Mississippi, Northwest Mississippi Community College)
Starkville (Mississippi State University)
Tougaloo (Tougaloo College)

Missouri
Bolivar (Southwest Baptist University)
Cape Girardeau (Southeast Missouri State University)
Columbia (University of Missouri, Stephens College, Columbia College)
Fayette (Central Methodist University)
Fulton (Westminster College, William Woods University)
Kirksville (Truman State University, A. T. Still University)
Maryville (Northwest Missouri State University)
Rolla (Missouri University of Science and Technology)
Warrensburg (University of Central Missouri)

Montana
Billings (Montana State University Billings, Rocky Mountain College, Yellowstone Baptist College)
Bozeman (Montana State University)
Butte (Montana Tech)
Dillon (University of Montana Western)
Great Falls (University of Great Falls, Great Falls College Montana State University)
Havre (Montana State University–Northern)
Helena (Carroll College, Helena College University of Montana)
Missoula (University of Montana)

Nebraska
Bellevue (Bellevue University)
Chadron (Chadron State College)
Crete (Doane College)
Fremont (Midland University)
Hastings (Hastings College)
Kearney (University of Nebraska at Kearney)
Lincoln (University of Nebraska at Lincoln, Nebraska Wesleyan University, Bryan College of Health Sciences)
Omaha (Creighton University, Clarkson College, College of Saint Mary, Grace University, Nebraska Methodist College)
Peru (Peru State College)
Seward (Concordia University)
Wayne (Wayne State College)
York (York College)

Nevada
Henderson (Nevada State College, National University, Roseman University of Health Sciences, Touro University Nevada)
Incline Village (Sierra Nevada College)
Reno (University of Nevada, Reno)

New Hampshire
Durham (University of New Hampshire)
Hanover (Dartmouth College)
Henniker (New England College)
Keene (Keene State College, Antioch University New England)
New London (Colby–Sawyer College)
Pinardville (Saint Anselm College)
Plymouth (Plymouth State University)

New Jersey
Ewing (The College of New Jersey, Rider University)
Jersey City (New Jersey City University, Saint Peter's University)
Glassboro (Rowan University)
Madison (Drew University, Fairleigh Dickinson University, College of Saint Elizabeth)
Montclair (Montclair State University)
Newark (Rutgers University, New Jersey Institute of Technology, UMDNJ)
New Brunswick (Rutgers University)
Paterson
Princeton (Princeton University, Westminster Choir College)
Ramsey (Ramapo College of New Jersey, Eastwick College)
South Orange (Seton Hall University)
Union (Kean University)
West Long Branch (Monmouth University)

New Mexico
Albuquerque (University of New Mexico, Southwest University of Visual Arts, Southwestern Indian Polytechnic Institute, Trinity Southwest University, University of St. Francis College of Nursing and Allied Health Department of Physician Assistant Studies, St. Norbert College Master of Theological Studies program; New Mexico State University, Highlands University, Lewis University, Wayland Baptist University, and Webster University; Brookline College, Pima Medical Institute, National American University, Grand Canyon University, the University of Phoenix and several barber/beauty colleges have established their presence in the area.)
Hobbs (University of the Southwest)
Las Cruces (New Mexico State University)
Las Vegas (New Mexico Highlands University)
Portales (Eastern New Mexico University)
Rio Rancho
Silver City (Western New Mexico University)
Socorro (New Mexico Institute of Mining and Technology)

New York
Albany (SUNY Albany, Siena College, Albany College of Pharmacy, Albany Law School, Albany Medical College, College of Saint Rose, Excelsior College, Maria College of Albany, Mildred Elley, Sage College of Albany)
Alfred (Alfred University, Alfred State College)
Aurora (Wells College)
Binghamton (Binghamton University)
Brockport (SUNY Brockport)
Canton (St. Lawrence University, SUNY Canton)
Clinton (Hamilton College)
Cortland (State University of New York at Cortland)
Cobleskill (SUNY Cobleskill)
Delhi (SUNY Delhi)
Fredonia (SUNY Fredonia)
Geneseo (SUNY Geneseo)
Geneva (Hobart and William Smith Colleges)
Hamilton (Colgate University)
Ithaca (Cornell University, Ithaca College)
Newburgh (Mount Saint Mary College)
New Paltz (SUNY New Paltz)
New Rochelle (Iona College)
Oneonta (SUNY Oneonta, Hartwick College)
Oswego (SUNY Oswego)
Plattsburgh (SUNY Plattsburgh)
Potsdam (SUNY Potsdam, Clarkson University)
Poughkeepsie (Vassar College, Marist College)
Purchase (Purchase College, Manhattanville College)
Rochester (University of Rochester, Rochester Institute of Technology, Nazareth College, St. John Fisher College, Monroe Community College, Roberts Wesleyan College, SUNY Brockport, SUNY Empire State College)
Saratoga Springs (Skidmore College)
Schenectady (Union College, Schenectady County Community College)
Seneca Falls (New York Chiropractic College)
Stony Brook (Stony Brook University)
Syracuse (Syracuse University, SUNY ESF, Upstate Medical University, Le Moyne College)
Tivoli (Bard College)
Troy (Rensselaer Polytechnic Institute, Russell Sage College, Hudson Valley Community College)
Utica (SUNY Polytechnic Institute, Utica University)
Valhalla (New York Medical College)
West Point (United States Military Academy)
Yonkers (Sarah Lawrence College)

North Carolina
Asheville (Shaw University, Lenoir-Rhyne University, University of North Carolina at Asheville, South College - Asheville)
Banner Elk (Lees-McRae College)
Belmont (Belmont Abbey College)
Boiling Springs (Gardner-Webb University)
Boone (Appalachian State University)
Brevard (Brevard College)
Buies Creek (Campbell University)
Chapel Hill (University of North Carolina at Chapel Hill)
Cullowhee (Western Carolina University)
Davidson (Davidson College)
Durham (Duke University, North Carolina Central University)
Elizabeth City (Mid-Atlantic Christian University)
Elon (Elon University)
Fayetteville (Methodist University)
 Greensboro (University of North Carolina at Greensboro, Greensboro College, Guilford College, North Carolina A & T State University, Bennett College, Elon University School of Law)
Greenville (East Carolina University)
Hickory (Lenoir-Rhyne University)
High Point (High Point University)
Laurinburg (St. Andrews University)
Mars Hill (Mars Hill College)
Misenheimer (Pfeiffer University)
Montreat (Montreat College)
Mount Olive (Mount Olive College)
Murfreesboro (Chowan University)
Pembroke (University of North Carolina at Pembroke)
Raleigh (North Carolina State University, Campbell University-Norman Adrian Wiggins School of Law, Meredith College, William Peace University, Shaw University, St. Augustine's University)
Rocky Mount (North Carolina Wesleyan College)
Salisbury (Catawba College, Livingstone College)
Wilmington (University of North Carolina at Wilmington)
Wilson (Barton College)
Wingate (Wingate University)
Winston-Salem (Wake Forest University, University of North Carolina School of the Arts, Salem College, Winston-Salem State University)

North Dakota
Bismarck (University of Mary, Rasmussen College)
Dickinson (Dickinson State University)
Fargo (North Dakota State University)
Grand Forks (University of North Dakota)
Jamestown (University of Jamestown)
Mayville (Mayville State University)
Minot (Minot State University)
Valley City (Valley City State University)

Ohio
Ada (Ohio Northern University)
Akron (University of Akron)
Alliance (University of Mount Union)
Ashland (Ashland University)
Athens (Ohio University)
Berea (Baldwin Wallace College)
Bluffton (Bluffton University)
Bowling Green (Bowling Green State University)
Cedarville (Cedarville University)
Columbus:
Downtown (Capital University Law School, Columbus College of Art and Design, Franklin University)
North Central neighborhood (Ohio Dominican University) 
University District (Ohio State University)
Dayton (University of Dayton, Wright State University Boonshoft School of Medicine)
Delaware (Ohio Wesleyan University)
Fairborn (Wright State University)
Findlay (University of Findlay)
Gambier (Kenyon College)
Granville (Denison University)
Hiram (Hiram College)
Kent (Kent State University)
Nelsonville (Hocking College)
New Concord (Muskingum College)
Oberlin (Oberlin College)
Oxford (Miami University)
Perrysburg Township (Owens Community College)
Rio Grande (University of Rio Grande)
Springfield (Wittenberg University)
Steubenville (Franciscan University of Steubenville) 
Tiffin (Tiffin University, Heidelberg University)
Toledo (University of Toledo, University of Toledo College of Medicine and Life Sciences, Davis College, Mercy College of Ohio)
Wilberforce (Wilberforce University, Central State University)
 Wooster (College of Wooster)
Yellow Springs (Antioch College, Antioch University Midwest)
 Youngstown (Youngstown State University)

Oklahoma
Ada (East Central University)
Alva (Northwestern Oklahoma State University)
Bethany (Southern Nazarene University)
Durant (Southeastern Oklahoma State University)
Edmond (University of Central Oklahoma, Oklahoma Christian University)
Goodwell (Oklahoma Panhandle State University)
Langston (Langston University)
Lawton (Cameron University)
Midwest City (Rose State College)
Norman (University of Oklahoma)
Oklahoma City (Oklahoma City University, University of Oklahoma - OU Medicine and the University of Oklahoma Health Sciences Center campuses, Oklahoma State University–Oklahoma City)
Stillwater (Oklahoma State University)
Tahlequah (Northeastern State University)
Tulsa (University of Tulsa)
Weatherford (Southwestern Oklahoma State University)

Oregon
Ashland (Southern Oregon University)
Corvallis (Oregon State University)
Eugene (University of Oregon, Lane Community College, Northwest Christian University)
Forest Grove (Pacific University)
Klamath Falls (Klamath Community College, Oregon Institute of Technology)
La Grande (Eastern Oregon University)
Lebanon (Western University of Health Sciences Oregon Branch: College of Osteopathic Medicine of the Pacific, Northwest)
Marylhurst (Marylhurst University)
McMinnville (Linfield College)
Monmouth (Western Oregon University)
Newberg (George Fox University)
Salem (Chemeketa Community College, Corban University, Tokyo International University of America, Willamette University)

Pennsylvania
Abington (Penn State Abington)
Allentown (Cedar Crest College, Muhlenberg College, a satellite campus of Lehigh Carbon Community College (LCCC))
Altoona (Penn State Altoona)
Annville (Lebanon Valley College)
Bethlehem (Lehigh University, Moravian College)
Bloomsburg (Bloomsburg University of Pennsylvania)
Bradford (University of Pittsburgh at Bradford)
California (California University of Pennsylvania)
Carlisle (Dickinson College, Penn State Dickinson School of Law)
Center Township, Beaver County (Penn State Beaver)
Center Valley (DeSales University, Penn State Lehigh Valley, Strayer University (Allentown campus))
Chambersburg (Wilson College)
Clarion (Clarion University of Pennsylvania)
Collegeville (Ursinus College)
Cresson (Mount Aloysius College)
Dunmore (Pennsylvania State University)
Easton (Lafayette College)
East Stroudsburg (East Stroudsburg University of Pennsylvania)
Edinboro (Edinboro University of Pennsylvania)
Erie (Gannon University, Mercyhurst College, Penn State Erie, Lake Erie College of Osteopathic Medicine)
Gettysburg (Gettysburg College)
Glenside (Arcadia University)
Grantham (Messiah College)
Greensburg (Seton Hill University, University of Pittsburgh at Greensburg, Lake Erie College of Osteopathic Medicine branch campus)
Grove City (Grove City College)
Harrisburg (Temple University Harrisburg Campus, Widener University Harrisburg Campus including its School of Law, Harrisburg University of Science and Technology, Messiah College's Harrisburg Institute, Penn State Harrisburg Eastgate Center, Dixon University Center, Harrisburg Area Community College)
Hershey (Penn State Hershey Medical Center)
Huntingdon (Juniata College) 
Indiana (Indiana University of Pennsylvania)
Johnstown:
Richland Township (University of Pittsburgh at Johnstown)
Kennett Square (University of Pennsylvania School of Veterinary Medicine)
Kutztown (Kutztown University of Pennsylvania)
Lancaster (Franklin & Marshall)
Lemoyne (Duquesne University (Capital Region Campus))
Lewisburg (Bucknell University)
Lock Haven (Lock Haven University of Pennsylvania)
Loretto (St. Francis University)
Lower Merion Township (Bryn Mawr College, Haverford College, Harcum College, Rosemont College, St. Charles Borromeo Seminary)
Merion (Saint Joseph's University)
Mansfield (Mansfield University of Pennsylvania)
Meadville (Allegheny College)
Mechanicsburg (Messiah College)
Mont Alto (Penn State Mont Alto)
Millersville (Millersville University of Pennsylvania)
New Wilmington (Westminster College)
North East (Mercyhurst North East)
Pittsburgh (University of Pittsburgh, Carnegie Mellon University, Chatham University, Dusquene University)
Reading (Albright College, Alvernia University, Penn State Berks)
Scranton (University of Scranton, The Commonwealth Medical College, Johnson College, Lackawanna College, Marywood University, Fortis Institute)
Selinsgrove (Susquehanna University)
Shippensburg (Shippensburg University of Pennsylvania)
Slippery Rock (Slippery Rock University of Pennsylvania)
State College:
Downtown State College (Pennsylvania State University - flagship campus)
Waupelani Heights (South Hills School of Business & Technology)
Summerdale (Central Penn College)
Swarthmore (Swarthmore College)
Upper Dublin Township (Temple University Ambler and Fort Washington campuses, DeVry University Fort Washington campus and Gwynedd Mercy College Fort Washington campus)
Villanova (Villanova University)
Waynesburg (Waynesburg University)
West Chester (West Chester University of Pennsylvania)
Wilkes-Barre (King's College, Wilkes University)
Williamsport (Lycoming College, Pennsylvania College of Technology)

Rhode Island
Bristol (Roger Williams University)
Kingston (University of Rhode Island)
Newport (Salve Regina University)
Providence:
 College Hill (Brown University - main campus, Rhode Island School of Design)
Downtown (University of Rhode Island - Feinstein Providence Campus, Roger Williams University)
Elmhurst (Providence College)
Jewelry District (Brown University - Alpert Medical School, Johnson and Wales University)
Lower South Providence (Community College of Rhode Island)
Manton (Rhode Island College)
Smithfield (Bryant University)
Warwick (Community College of Rhode Island)

South Carolina
Beaufort (University of South Carolina Beaufort)
Central (Southern Wesleyan University)
Charleston (College of Charleston, The Citadel, MUSC, Charleston School of Law)
Clemson (Clemson University)
Clinton (Presbyterian College)
Columbia (University of South Carolina)
Due West (Erskine College)
Florence (Francis Marion University)
Greenville (Bob Jones University, Furman University, North Greenville University, University of South Carolina School of Medicine)
Greenwood (Lander University)
North Charleston (Charleston Southern University, Trident Technical College - Main Campus)
Orangeburg (South Carolina State University, Claflin University)
Rock Hill (Winthrop University)
Spartanburg (Wofford College, Converse College, University of South Carolina Upstate, Spartanburg Methodist College, Edward Via College of Osteopathic Medicine, Spartanburg Community College, Virginia College, Sherman College of Chiropractic)

South Dakota
Aberdeen
Brookings (South Dakota State University)
Madison (Dakota State University)
Rapid City (South Dakota School of Mines & Technology)
Sioux Falls (University of Sioux Falls, Augustana University, Sioux Falls Seminary, Kilian Community College, Southeast Technical Institute, National American University, South Dakota School for the Deaf, Globe University/Minnesota School of Business, University of South Dakota's Sanford School of Medicine (Sioux Falls campus), Stewart School, South Dakota Public Universities and Research Center (USDSU))
Spearfish (Black Hills State University)
Vermillion (University of South Dakota)

Tennessee
Chattanooga (University of Tennessee at Chattanooga)
Clarksville (Austin Peay State University, Miller-Motte Technical College, Nashville State Community College, Daymar Institute, North Tennessee Bible Institute)
Collegedale (Southern Adventist University)
Cookeville (Tennessee Technological University)
Harrogate (Lincoln Memorial University)
Henderson (Freed-Hardeman University)
Johnson City (East Tennessee State University)
Knoxville (University of Tennessee, Duncan School of Law (Lincoln Memorial Univ.))
Lebanon (Cumberland University)
Martin (University of Tennessee at Martin)
Memphis (Baptist College of Health Sciences, Christian Brothers University, LeMoyne-Owen College, Memphis College of Art, Rhodes College, Southern College of Optometry, Southwest Tennessee Community College, Union University - Germantown campus, University of Memphis, University of Tennessee Health Science Center
McKenzie (Bethel University)
Murfreesboro (Middle Tennessee State University)
Nashville (Vanderbilt University, Belmont University, Tennessee State University, Lipscomb University, Fisk University, Aquinas College, Trevecca Nazarene University, Meharry Medical College, Nashville School of Law)
Sewanee (Sewanee: the University of the South)

Texas
Abilene (Abilene Christian University, Hardin-Simmons University, McMurry University)
Alpine (Sul Ross State University)
Amarillo (Wayland Baptist University branch campus, Texas Tech University Health Sciences Center at Amarillo School of Pharmacy, Texas Tech University at Amarillo, West Texas A&M University satellite campus)
Arlington (University of Texas at Arlington)
Austin (University of Texas at Austin, St. Edward's University)
Beaumont (Lamar University)
Belton (University of Mary Hardin-Baylor)
Big Spring (Howard College)
Brownsville (The University of Texas Rio Grande Valley)
Brenham (Blinn College)
Bryan (Texas A&M University, Blinn College – Bryan Campus, Texas A&M Health Science Center)
Canyon (West Texas A&M University)
College Station (Texas A&M University)
Commerce (Texas A&M University–Commerce)
Corpus Christi (Texas A&M University-Corpus Christi, Del Mar College, Saint Leo University-Corpus Christi)
Denton (University of North Texas, Texas Woman's University, Texas A&M University Baylor College of Dentistry)
Edinburg (University of Texas Rio Grande Valley)
El Paso (University of Texas at El Paso)
Fort Worth (Texas Christian University, Texas Wesleyan University, Texas A&M School of Law)
Galveston (Texas A&M University at Galveston)
Georgetown (Southwestern University)
Garland (Amberton University)
Huntsville (Sam Houston State University)
Irving (University of Dallas, North Lake College)
Keene (Southwestern Adventist University)
Killeen (Central Texas College, Texas A&M University-Central Texas)
Kingsville (Texas A&M University–Kingsville)
Laredo (Texas A&M International University, University of Texas Health Science Center at San Antonio - Laredo campus)
Lubbock (Texas Tech University, Lubbock Christian University)
McAllen (University of Texas Rio Grande Valley)
Mesquite (Texas A&M University–Commerce Mesquite Metroplex Center, Columbia College-Mesquite Campus)
Nacogdoches (Stephen F. Austin State University)
Odessa (The University of Texas Permian Basin)
Pasadena (University of Houston–Clear Lake)
Pearland (University of Houston–Clear Lake satellite campus)
Plainview (Wayland Baptist University)
Plano (Southern Methodist University branch campus, Dallas Baptist University satellite campus)
Prairie View (Prairie View A&M University)
Richardson (University of Texas at Dallas main campus)
San Angelo (Angelo State University)
San Marcos (Texas State University)
Stephenville (Tarleton State University)
Texarkana (Texas A&M University–Texarkana)
Tyler (The University of Texas at Tyler)
University Park (Southern Methodist University)
Waco (Baylor University)
Wichita Falls (Midwestern State University)

Utah
Cedar City (Southern Utah University)
Ephraim (Snow College)
Logan (Utah State University)
Ogden (Weber State University)
Orem (Utah Valley University)
Provo (Brigham Young University)
South Jordan (Roseman University of Health Sciences College of Dental Medicine)
St. George (Dixie State University)

Vermont
Bennington (Bennington College)
Burlington (University of Vermont, Champlain College)
Castleton (Castleton University)
Colchester (Saint Michael's College)
Craftsbury (Sterling College)
Johnson (Northern Vermont University–Johnson)
Lyndonville (Northern Vermont University–Lyndon)
Middlebury (Middlebury College)
Northfield (Norwich University)

Virginia
Alexandria (The George Washington University, Virginia Commonwealth University branch campus)
Amherst (Sweet Briar College)
Arlington (Marymount University, George Mason University)
Blacksburg (Virginia Tech)
Bridgewater (Bridgewater College)
Charlottesville (University of Virginia)
Chesapeake (Averett University, DeVry University, Troy University, Tidewater Community College, Strayer University, Everest University, Sentera College of Health Sciences, St Leo University)
Farmville (Longwood University, Hampden-Sydney College)
Fredericksburg (University of Mary Washington)
Hampton (Hampton University, Bryant and Stratton College)
Harrisonburg (James Madison University, Eastern Mennonite University)
Lexington (Washington and Lee University, Virginia Military Institute)
Lynchburg (Lynchburg College, Randolph College, Liberty University, Virginia University of Lynchburg, Central Virginia Community College)
Newport News (Christopher Newport University)
Norfolk (Old Dominion University, Norfolk State University)
Portsmouth (Old Dominion University)
Radford (Radford University)
Richmond (University of Richmond, Virginia Commonwealth University)
Roanoke (Hollins University, Roanoke College, Jefferson College of Health Sciences, Virginia Western Community College)
Staunton (Mary Baldwin University)
Virginia Beach (Regent University, Atlantic University, Virginia Wesleyan College, University of Virginia and Virginia Tech satellite campuses, ECPI University)
Williamsburg (College of William & Mary)
Wise (University of Virginia's College at Wise)

Washington
Bellingham (Western Washington University)
Cheney (Eastern Washington University)
Ellensburg (Central Washington University)
Lakewood (Clover Park Technical College and Pierce College)
Parkland (Pacific Lutheran University)
Pullman (Washington State University)
Richland (Washington State University Tri-Cities)
Walla Walla (Whitman College)

West Virginia
Athens (Concord University)
Beckley (West Virginia University Institute of Technology)
Buckhannon (West Virginia Wesleyan College)
Elkins (Davis & Elkins College)
Fairmont (Fairmont State University)
Glenville (Glenville State College)
 Huntington (Marshall University)
Institute (West Virginia State University)
Lewisburg (West Virginia School of Osteopathic Medicine)
Morgantown (West Virginia University)
Shepherdstown (Shepherd University)
West Liberty (West Liberty University)

Wisconsin
Appleton (Lawrence University)
Eau Claire (University of Wisconsin–Eau Claire)
Green Bay (University of Wisconsin-Green Bay)
Kenosha (University of Wisconsin-Parkside, Carthage College, Kenosha campus of Gateway Technical College, National-Louis University, Herzing University)
La Crosse (University of Wisconsin–La Crosse, Western Technical College, Viterbo University)
Madison (University of Wisconsin–Madison)
Menomonie (University of Wisconsin–Stout)
Milwaukee (University of Wisconsin–Milwaukee, Marquette University, Milwaukee School of Engineering, Milwaukee Institute of Art and Design)
Oshkosh (University of Wisconsin–Oshkosh)
Platteville (University of Wisconsin–Platteville)
River Falls (University of Wisconsin–River Falls)
Stevens Point (University of Wisconsin–Stevens Point)
Waukesha (Carroll University)
Whitewater (University of Wisconsin–Whitewater)

Wyoming
Laramie (University of Wyoming)

Puerto Rico
Mayagüez, Puerto Rico (UPR Mayagüez, Hostos School of Law, Pontifical Catholic University, Antillean Adventist University)
Ponce, Puerto Rico (Caribbean University, Inter-American University, Ponce School of Medicine, Pontifical Catholic University, University of Puerto Rico at Ponce, University of Turabo at Ponce)
Rio Piedras, Puerto Rico (University of Puerto Rico, Recinto de Río Piedras)

University towns in Australia

Australian Capital Territory 
 Canberra:
 Belconnen (Bruce suburb) (University of Canberra)
 North Canberra (Acton suburb) (Australian National University)
 North Canberra (Watson suburb) (Australian Catholic University)
 South Canberra (Barton suburb) (Charles Sturt University)

New South Wales 
 Albury (Charles Sturt University, La Trobe University)
 Armidale (University of New England)
 Bathurst (Charles Sturt University)
 Campbelltown (Western Sydney University)
 Coffs Harbour (Southern Cross University)
 Dubbo (Charles Sturt University)
 Lismore (Southern Cross University)
 Newcastle:
 Callaghan (University of Newcastle)
 Orange (Charles Sturt University)
 Ourimbah:
 Central Coast (University of Newcastle - Ourimbah campus)
 Port Macquarie (Charles Sturt University)
 Richmond (Western Sydney University)
 Tamworth
 Wagga Wagga (Charles Sturt University)
 Wollongong (University of Wollongong)

Northern Territory 
 Darwin (Charles Darwin University)

Queensland 
 Brisbane:
 Gardens Point (Queensland University of Technology)
 Herston (University of Queensland Mayne Medical School)
 Kelvin Grove (Queensland University of Technology)
 Mount Gravatt, Nathan, South Bank (Griffith University)
 St Lucia (University of Queensland)
 Banyo (Australian Catholic University)
 Bundaberg (Central Queensland University)
 Cairns (James Cook University)
 Coolangatta (Southern Cross University - Gold Coast campus)
 Gladstone (Central Queensland University)
 Gold Coast:
 Southport (Griffith University) 
 Lawes (University of Queensland Gatton Campus) 
 Logan City
 Meadowbrook (Griffith University) 
 Mackay (Central Queensland University) 
 Petrie (University of the Sunshine Coast) 
 Rockhampton (Central Queensland University) 
 Robina (Bond University) 
 Sippy Downs (University of the Sunshine Coast) 
 Springfield (University of Southern Queensland) 
 Toowoomba (University of Southern Queensland) 
 Townsville (James Cook University)

South Australia 
 Adelaide:
 Bedford Park, Tonsley (Flinders University)
 City centre (Carnegie Mellon University, Torrens University, UCL Australia, Flinders University)
 Magill (University of South Australia)
 North Terrace (University of Adelaide, University of South Australia)
 Salisbury (Mawson Lakes suburb) (University of South Australia)
 Mount Gambier (University of South Australia, Southern Cross University and Flinders University)
 Whyalla (University of South Australia)

Tasmania 
 Burnie (University of Tasmania)
 Hobart:
 Sandy Bay (University of Tasmania)
 Launceston:
 Newnham (University of Tasmania, Australian Maritime College)

Victoria 
 Ararat (Federation University Australia)
 Ballarat (Federation University Australia)
 Bendigo (La Trobe University - Bendigo campus)
 Churchill (Federation University Australia)
 Geelong (Deakin University)
 Horsham (Federation University Australia)
 Stawell (Federation University Australia)
 Wangaratta
 Warrnambool (Deakin University)
 Wodonga (La Trobe University)

Western Australia 
 Albany (University of Western Australia)
 Broome (University of Notre Dame Australia)
 Bunbury (Edith Cowan University)
 Fremantle (University of Notre Dame Australia)
 Joondalup (Edith Cowan University)
 Perth:
 Bentley (Curtin University)
 Crawley (University of Western Australia - main campus)
 Greenfields (Murdoch University)
 Mount Lawley (Edith Cowan University)
 Murdoch (Murdoch University)
 Rockingham (Murdoch University)

New Zealand  
 Dunedin (University of Otago, Otago Polytechnic)
 Hamilton (Waikato University)
 Lincoln (Lincoln University)
 Palmerston North (Massey University)
 Wellington (Victoria University of Wellington)

References 

Lists of populated places
Universities and colleges